William M. Morse (December 18, 1826 – June 22, 1875) was an American surveyor and politician.

Morse was born in Alderley, Gloucestershire, England. In 1846, Morse emigrated to the United States and settled in Dodge County, Wisconsin Territory. Eventually he settled in Rubicon, Wisconsin and was a surveyor. Morse was a Democrat. He served as chairman of the Rubicon Town Board. He also served as clerk and superintendent of public schools of his town. From 1851 to 1859, Morse served as the Dodge County Surveyor. He was served on the Dodge County Board of Supervisors and was chairman of the county board. Morse served in the Wisconsin Assembly in 1857, 1866, and 1875. Morse died suddenly in Rubicon, Wisconsin while still in the Wisconsin Assembly.

Notes

External links

1826 births
1875 deaths
English emigrants to the United States
People from Alderley, Gloucestershire
People from Rubicon, Wisconsin
American surveyors
Mayors of places in Wisconsin
County supervisors in Wisconsin
County officials in Wisconsin
Democratic Party members of the Wisconsin State Assembly
19th-century American politicians